Vitashoka or Tissa (born 3rd-century BCE) was a prince of the Maurya Empire as the only full-brother of Ashoka, and the only brother left alive by Ashoka. According to Divyavadana, he was a follower of the Tirthikas and used to criticize the Buddhist monks for living a comfortable life. He was made to sit on the throne by the courtiers. When Ashoka found out about that, he persuaded Vitashoka to become a Buddhist.

Vitashoka became a monk and practised austerities rigorously.

Name
Vitashoka is referred to as Tissa (or Tisya) in Sri Lankan texts. Theragatha commentary regards Tissa and Vitashoka as different individuals. Other sources call him Vigatāshoka, Sudatta, or Sugatra. The Mahavamsa later names him as Ekavihārika.

In the Divyavadana
Divyavadana narrates a story of someone in Pundravardhana and then again at Pataliputra who drew a picture of the Buddha bowing before Nirgrantha Nataputta. As a punishment, Ashoka ordered the Ajivikas to be put to death and declared a reward for killing of Nirgranthas. Someone killed Vitashoka taking him to be a Nirgrantha. His head was taken to Ashoka. After identifying that it was his own brother, Ashoka stopped giving orders for executions.
However, according to the more authentic works based on Ashoka's life, Vitashoka's fate remains unknown after Ashoka becomes king. Some scholars suggested that Vitashoka may have been a general or a minister of Ashoka.

References

Mauryan dynasty